Raghavaiah or Raghavayya is one of the Indian personal names.

 Kosaraju Raghavaiah was a Telugu poet and writer. 
 Vedantam Raghavayya was veteran Telugu film actor, choreographer, director and producer.
 Vennelakanti Raghavaiah was an Indian freedom activist and Social worker.